This article is a list of diseases of spinach (Spinacia oleracea).

Bacterial diseases

Fungal and Oomycete diseases

Nematodes, parasitic

Viral diseases

Phytoplasmal diseases

Miscellaneous diseases and disorders

References 

 Common Names of Diseases, The American Phytopathological Society

Lists of plant diseases
Leaf vegetable diseases
Spinach